The cinereous antshrike (Thamnomanes caesius) is an insectivorous bird in the antbird family Thamnophilidae.  The term cinereous describes its colouration. It is found in Bolivia, Brazil, Colombia, Ecuador, French Guiana, Guyana, Peru, Suriname, and Venezuela. Its natural habitat is subtropical or tropical moist lowland forests.

The cinereous antshrike was described by the Dutch zoologist Coenraad Jacob Temminck in 1820 and given the binomial name Muscicapa caesius.  It is now placed in the genus Thamnomanes which was introduced by the German ornithologist Jean Cabanis in 1847. The specific epithet caesius is the Latin for "bluish gray".

There are five subspecies:
 T. c. glaucus Cabanis, 1847 – east Colombia to northeast Peru, the Guianas and north Brazil
 T. c. persimilis Hellmayr, 1907 – central Brazil
 T. c. simillimus Gyldenstolpe, 1951 – south central Brazil
 T. c. hoffmannsi Hellmayr, 1906 – east central Brazil
 T. c. caesius (Temminck, 1820) – east Brazil

References

External links
Xeno-canto: audio recordings of the cinereous antshrike
Image at ADW 

cinereous antshrike
Birds of the Guianas
Birds of the Atlantic Forest
cinereous antshrike
Birds of Brazil
Taxonomy articles created by Polbot